Milan-e Baba Ahmadi (also Romanized as Mīlān-e Bābā Aḩmadī; also known as Mīlān-e Bābāaḩmadī) is a village in Falard Rural District, Falard District, Lordegan County, Chaharmahal and Bakhtiari Province, Iran. At the 2006 census, its population was 563, in 107 families. The village is populated by Lurs.

References 

Populated places in Lordegan County
Luri settlements in Chaharmahal and Bakhtiari Province